Mark Anthony Wyatt (born 19 February 1957) is a former Welsh international rugby union player. He played club rugby for several university teams, and later Swansea. He was selected to play for Wales on ten occasions, scoring 81 points. Mark was famed for his attacking fullback play and his place kicking. He is the record points scorer for Swansea with 2734 points. Mark's current sporting interest lie on the golf course, playing off a handicap of 4 and he is a member of The Royal Porthcawl Golf club. He is a Director at Gower Business Systems Ltd a leading ICT company in South Wales.

References

1957 births
Living people
Barbarian F.C. players
Rugby union fullbacks
Rugby union players from Crickhowell
Swansea RFC players
Wales international rugby union players
Welsh rugby union players